Amuri is a town on Aitutaki in the Cook Islands. It is located at 18°52'0S 159°46'0W. By population, Amuri is the second-largest settlement in the Cook Islands, after the capital, Avarua.

References

Populated places in the Cook Islands
Aitutaki